Wātarmah-ye Pā’īn is a village in Daykundi Province, in central Afghanistan.

See also
Daykundi Province

References

Populated places in Daykundi Province